The South African National War Museum in Johannesburg was officially opened by Prime Minister Jan Smuts on 29 August 1947 to preserve the history of South Africa's involvement in the Second World War. In 1975, the museum was renamed the South African National Museum of Military History and its function changed to include all conflicts that South Africa has been involved in. In 1999 it was amalgamated with the Pretoria-based Transvaal Museum and National Cultural History Museum to form the NFI. In April 2010 Ditsong was officially renamed Ditsong Museums of South Africa and the SANMMH was renamed the Ditsong National Museum of Military History.

The Anglo-Boer War Memorial

In the grounds of the museum is a large memorial designed by Sir Edwin Lutyens.

On 30 November 1910 Prince Arthur, Duke of Connaught and Strathearn laid a commemorative stone at the memorial.

Originally called the Rand Regiments Memorial and dedicated to British soldiers that lost their lives during the Second Boer War, it was rededicated on 10 October 1999 to all people who died during the Second Boer War and renamed the Boer War Memorial.

Exhibits

The museum is divided into a number of areas
The Main Courtyard
 A memorial erected in honour of fallen members of the airborne forces of 44 Parachute Regiment, 44 Parachute Brigade and the South African Special Forces
 A memorial honouring members of 61 Mechanised Battalion Group
 Various field guns such as the 8.8 cm Flak 37 gun, QF 1-pounder pom-pom guns, 5 cm Pak 38, etc.

The GP Capt. "Sailor" Malan Hall with
 Messerschmitt Bf 109
 Messerschmitt Me 262
 Focke-Wulf Fw 190

The GE Brink Hall with
 Hawker Hurricane
 Royal Aircraft Factory S.E.5
 Supermarine Spitfire
 Messerschmitt Bf 109
 de Havilland Mosquito
 Hawker Hartebeest
 A Battle of Britain exhibit
 Artifacts from the Royal Air Force
 Artifacts from South Africa's involvement in various world conflicts, such as the Korean War and the two World Wars
 A large medal collection from various veterans of the armed forces, such as General Jan Smuts and General George Brink
 Anglo Boer War exhibits
 An exhibit honouring members of the Native Military Corps (1940–50), Indian Service Corps (1940–42) and the Cape Corps (1940–50)
 An exhibit detailing major events in South African history between the Boer Wars and the 1994 South African general elections. Events covered include the political divisions in the country during the First and Second World Wars, the Rand Rebellion (1921-1922), the sabotage campaign of the Ossewabrandwag during the Second World War and South Africa's involvement in the Angolan Civil War.

Dan Pienaar Gun Park
 Various guns from around the world such as the British Ordnance QF 18-pounder and the BL 6-inch Gun Mk XIX and the German 7.7 cm FK 96 field gun.

The FB Adler Hall with
 Sexton self-propelled gun
 M4 Sherman tank
 M3 Stuart tank
 A large number of artillery pieces such as the Ordnance QF 20 pounder and the BL 5.5-inch Medium Gun
 Exhibits detailing South Africa's involvement in World War II, including artefacts such as uniforms, firearms, helmets, and flags from various countries
 Anglo-Zulu War exhibits
 South African Border War exhibit
 A small South African Navy exhibit
 A large collection of uniforms, ceremonial swords, infantry swords, cavalry swords, bayonets and daggers
 A large variety of small arms from around the world, such as the Bren light machine gun, the M1 Garand, Mauser rifles, Lee–Enfield rifles, the Maxim gun, the MG 42, the Thompson submachine gun, the Winchester Model 1876, the AK-47, the Vektor R4 Rifle R1 Rifle, and various other muskets, rifles and machine guns.

Outdoor exhibits
 A small 32 Battalion indoor exhibit
 Molch one man submarine 
 QF 4 inch Mk XVI naval gun turret from a South African Navy Loch-class frigate
 Aircraft such as the Blackburn Buccaneer S Mk 50, the Douglas C-47 'Dakota', the Dassault Mirage III and the Impala MkII
 South African/British armoured vehicles such as the Comet tank, the Centurion tank, the Crusader tank and the Churchill tank
 Captured Angolan/Cuban/Soviet vehicles such as the T-34/85 tank, the T-54/55 tank and the PT-76 amphibious tank
 Captured Italian/German vehicles such as the Carro Veloce CV-35 tank and the Sd.Kfz. 251 half-track
 A large collection of heavy artillery featuring the G5 howitzer and the G6 howitzer

Lt Gen AML Masondo Library building with
 A library with literature concerning South Africa's military history
 Armoured vehicles such as the Alvis Saracen, Ford Lynx, Ratel-20, Daimler Ferret, M9A1 Half-track, Universal Carrier, several different models of the Marmon-Herrington and Eland Mk7 armoured cars, etc.
 More artefacts of World War I and World War II

Capt W F Faulds VC MC Centre
 Opened in 1995, built using insurance funds from the theft of the William Faulds medals, and consists of
 The Delville Wood Room, a seminar and conference room which contains a plaster-cast of a  Danie de Jager relief from the Delville Wood South African National Memorial in France.
 The Marrières Wood Room, a gathering and dining room.

See also

 South African Air Force Museum
 South African Naval Museum
 Military history of South Africa

References

External links

 Official website
 Google Maps view with overlay of images from Commons

Museums in Johannesburg
Military history of South Africa
Military and war museums in South Africa
Second Boer War memorials